Daniel Michel Cousin (born 7 February 1977) is a Gabonese former professional footballer who played as a striker. 

He played for Martigues, Chamois Niortais, Le Mans Union Club 72, RC Lens, Rangers, Hull City, Larissa and Sapins, as well as the Gabon national team.

In March 2019, Cousin formally signed a contract to serve as a coach of Gabon national team despite being confirmed in September 2018, but left a few weeks later before being appointed manager of French club ES Fos-sur-Mer.

Early life
Born in Libreville, Estuaire Province, Cousin moved to Marseille, France, when he was three.

Club career

France
Cousin played in the lower leagues in France for Martigues and Niort before moving to Le Mans Union Club 72.

He joined RC Lens in the summer of 2004. Whilst at RC Lens he appeared in the UEFA Cup in both 2005–06 and 2006–07 starting 13 games with 2 appearances as a sub netting 8 goals in the process. Lens qualified for the 2005–06 tournament after triumphing in the UEFA Intertoto Cup competition with Cousin starting in 5 games, making 3 sub appearances and scoring 3 goals including one in the final itself versus CFR Cluj of Romania.

Rangers
On 9 August 2007, Cousin arrived at Murray Park in Glasgow to hold contract talks over a move and signed a three-year deal for a reported fee of £750,000. He scored his first goal for Rangers on his debut in a 2–0 home league win against St Mirren on 11 August 2007, and scored twice on his first start a week later against Falkirk.

Cousin played at Ibrox, against Lyon in the UEFA Champions League on 12 December 2007. Rangers lost 3–0 with Cousin playing the first half before getting substituted for Steven Naismith in that game. In November 2007 he was linked with a transfer away from Rangers, and it was reported that he had a release clause in his current contract which means he could leave in January 2008. This was denied by Rangers but the club did reveal there was a £3 million release clause during the 2008 summer transfer window.

On 21 January 2008 it was reported that Premier League side Fulham had had a £2 million bid rejected by Rangers manager Walter Smith. The next day a bid of £3 million from Fulham activated a release clause, however FIFA regulations meant Cousin required special dispensation to complete the move. On 29 January, the transfer was cancelled as FIFA did not grant permission but it later emerged that FIFA had not reached a decision over the transfer. On 29 February, FIFA announced it would not allow the deal to be completed.

On 1 May 2008, Cousin was sent off during extra time of the Fiorentina v Rangers UEFA Cup semi-final second leg match for a headbutt. Despite Cousin's sending off, Rangers progressed to win the game on penalties. A matter of days later, he did the same to Dundee United defender Lee Wilkie, in a 3–1 win mired in refereeing controversy. Although he was not sent off, Cousin was widely criticised for his stupidity. On 31 August, Cousin scored the opening goal in the first Old Firm match of the season. Rangers went on to win the match 4–2 and he was later sent off for two bookable offences. This was the player's final game for Rangers, but Rangers' then-assistant manager Ally McCoist said: "That was as good a centre-forward performance in an Old Firm game as I've ever seen from anybody. That particular day he was phenomenal."

Hull City

On 1 September 2008, Cousin signed for English Premier League side Hull City on a three-year deal for an undisclosed fee. Cousin scored his first Hull goal against Arsenal at the Emirates Stadium on 27 September 2008. His header was the decisive goal and helped to exalt Hull City to a historic 1–2 victory against Arsenal at their home. He scored in a 4–3 defeat to Manchester United at Old Trafford before scoring again at home to Manchester City. On 1 September 2009, a loan deal to Premier League rivals Burnley fell through. In total, Cousin scored five goals in 33 matches for the Tigers.

Larissa
Cousin joined the Greek side Larissa on loan for the second half of the 2009–10 season. He was the second player from Gabon to play for Larissa after Henry Antchouet. The transfer was made permanent on 18 August 2010. Despite a good performance the following season, Larissa were relegated from the top tier, and he left the club.

Sapins
On 13 October 2011, Cousin returned home to Gabon to play for local team Sapins FC in an attempt to boost his chances of playing at the 2012 Africa Cup of Nations. The deal with Sapins allowed the striker to leave without any conditions if he received an offer from a club in Europe. Cousin was released by Sapins on 31 January 2012. Cousin agreed personal terms to rejoin Rangers until the end of the season, but Rangers entered administration and had a transfer embargo applied by the Scottish Premier League. When Rangers attempted to register Cousin with the league, their application was rejected.

International career

Cousin made his debut for Gabon on 23 January 2000 in a 3–1 defeat to South Africa. He participated in all three of Gabon's matches at the 2000 Africa Cup of Nations. On 2 September 2006, he was made captain of the national team and led them to a 4–0 win over Madagascar. He scored the only goal in a 1–0 win at the 2010 Africa Cup of Nations over Cameroon.

Coaching career
On 4 September 2014, Cousin was named general manager of the Gabon national team. In September 2018, he became manager of the Gabon national team. He left in March 2019.

On 20 May 2019, Cousin was appointed manager of French club ES Fos-sur-Mer. He was sacked on 30 September 2019.

In June 2020, Cousin joined the technical staff of FC Côte Bleue, where he would be in charge of the attacking section of the U18 to the senior reserve of the French club.

Career statistics

International goals
Scores and results list Gabon's goal tally first, score column indicates score after each Cousin goal.

Honours
Lens
UEFA Intertoto Cup: 2005

References

External links
 
 
 Daniel Cousin Interview

1977 births
Living people
Sportspeople from Libreville
Gabonese footballers
Gabon international footballers
2000 African Cup of Nations players
2010 Africa Cup of Nations players
2012 Africa Cup of Nations players
Association football forwards
FC Martigues players
Chamois Niortais F.C. players
Le Mans FC players
RC Lens players
Gabonese emigrants to France
Rangers F.C. players
Hull City A.F.C. players
Athlitiki Enosi Larissa F.C. players
Sapins FC players
Ligue 1 players
Ligue 2 players
Scottish Premier League players
Premier League players
Super League Greece players
Gabonese football managers
Gabon national football team managers
Gabonese expatriate footballers
Expatriate footballers in Scotland
Gabonese expatriate sportspeople in France
Expatriate footballers in France
Gabonese expatriate sportspeople in Greece
Expatriate footballers in Greece
Gabonese expatriate sportspeople in England
Expatriate footballers in England
2014 African Nations Championship players
Gabon A' international footballers